Vidyakara (c. 1050–1130) was a Buddhist scholar and poetry anthologist, noted for the Sanskrit poetry compilation Subhashitaratnakosha (IAST: Subhāṣitaratnakoṣa), which has been considered the "most celebrated" anthology of Sanskrit verse.  Most of the verses, where authorship is noted, range over the two centuries prior to compilation; hence it may be thought of as a compilation of "modern verse" for the period.

Little is known about Vidyakara himself. D. D. Kosambi has argued compellingly that Vidyakara was a senior monk at the Jagaddala Vihara monastery in North Bengal, based on evidence including markings on the palm-leaf manuscript of an earlier edition of the work, claimed to be Vidyakara's original, of what may have been shelfmarks from the library in Jagaddala.

Subhashitaratnakosha
Two different versions of the anthology exist. The manuscripts were lost in Bengal during the Islamic period.  Late in the 19th century, a palm leaf manuscript was located in Ngor monastery in Tibet.  This is now considered to be the first edition, compiled in the later years of the 1090s.  Kosambi has argued that this manuscript may even be the original of Vidyakara, and that it constitutes the first edition of the compilation. A second manuscript, in paper, was located in the private collection of the Nepalese rajaguru (royal priest), Pundit Hemaraja.  This is believed to be the second edition, compiled by no later than 1130.

The earlier edition was published by F. W. Thomas in 1912 under the title Kavindra Vachana Samucchaya.  Some of the verses in the palm leaf contain some additional annotations, and Kosambi has argued for these being shelfmarks, possibly from the library at Jagaddal Vihar, where Vidyakara may have done the research to locate the verses.

A second version, with 1,732 poems, was located later in a paper manuscript in Ngor monastery in Tibet. The first version is considered to be an earlier edition of the final compilation; it is felt that Vidyakara may have devoted many years to creating this compilation.  The definitive text of this second edition was edited by D. D. Kosambi and V. V. Gokhale, with inputs from Daniel Ingalls (Harvard Oriental Series, 1957). Kosambi prepared a long introduction regarding the provenance of the collection, though he critiqued the poetry as being inferior, having come from a stagnant period without class struggle.

Poets
Many of the authors in the Subhashitaratnakosha are not identified. Of the 275 identified names, only eleven seem to be earlier than the 7th century. Thus, the selection has a distinctly modernist tenor.
Though the most popular are well-known poets from recent centuries:
Rajashekhara, Murari, and Bhavabhuti.
Many of the favoured authors - Vallana, Yogeshvara, Vasukalpa,
Manovinoda, Abhinanda were all Bengalis or at least easterners of the Pala
kingdom, the core of which comprised Bengal and Bihar.  These authors are all more or less contemporaneous or just preceding Vidyakara.  Among the less
frequently quoted authors are many Pala princes of state and church whose
verses are not found in any other extant work. Among them are Dharmapala,
Rajyapala, Buddhakaragupta, Khipaka, and Jnanashri. Though Vidyakara quotes
verses of classical authors like Kalidasa, Rajashekhara, and Bhavabhuti, he
shows a "special predilection for eastern or Bengali poets".

Some of these authors were contemporaries of Vidyakara, and it is possible he may have known them.  In addition to the Jagaddala Vihara, he is certain to have had access to the libraries at the five major viharas across Eastern India, since there was considerable mobility among scholars between these state-managed campuses.

The breakup of the most frequent authors, as presented by  Kosambi and Gokhale is:

Themes
Although Vidyakara may have been a Buddhist monk, the dominant theme in the collection is that of love poetry, many of them decidedly erotic in tone.  The book is compiled into thematic sections.  Opening with verses on the Bodhisattvas (most of them composed by professors and others at the Viharas, near contemporaries), the text also includes several sections on Hindu topics (Shiva, Vishnu). Vidyakara included more verses in praise of the Hindu gods than he did of the Buddha. Subsequent sections quickly slip into the romantic mode, with several chapters dealing with the seasons, messengers, different periods of the day.

A later compilation, Shridharadasa's Saduktikarnamrta (1205), also from the Bengal region, has considerable overlap with Vidyakara (623 verses out of 2377).  Though it is larger, the aesthetic discernment of Vidyakara has been greatly admired.

The volume of translations by Ingalls is the most complete version in English; the poetic quality of the translations is high.  Selected poems
in the collection have also been translated by many others.

References

1050s births
1130 deaths
Sanskrit poets